Joseph Lucas Horrocks (1803–1865) was born in Anderton, Lancashire, near Bolton, on 18 November 1803, the first son of William Horrocks, a corn merchant, and Jane Smith. As a convict he was transported to Western Australia in 1851, becoming a prominent early pioneer of the town of Northampton.

Little is known of his early life, except that he was educated, and that at some point he worked as a sick bay attendant in the Royal Navy.

In the 1850s he was carrying on business as a merchant and drysalter in Manchester, trading as Horrocks, Schaer, and Co, and in London, in partnership with Gustav Kober, as Gustav Kober and Co. He was declared bankrupt on 21 March 1851 at Manchester. His secured creditors received 3/10 (£0.19) in the pound.

The UK Census of 31 March 1851 showed Horrocks to be resident at London's Newgate Prison. On 9 April 1851 he pleaded guilty at the Old Bailey in London to forging and uttering three bills of exchange totaling £1,247/0/2 (£1,247.01) and was sentenced to fourteen years transportation.  Horrocks departed Woolwich on 23 October 1851 and Portland on 2 November 1851 on board the Marion, arriving at Fremantle on 31 January 1852.

In 1852 Horrocks worked in the medical section of the Convict Establishment at Fremantle. He was granted a ticket of leave in June 1853. The scarcity of medical officers led him to apply for the post of medical attendant at the Convict Hiring Depot at Lynton, seven miles from Port Gregory, a position that he accepted at a reduced salary of £20 a year because of his limited qualifications. In September 1853 he left Fremantle in the brig Hero. At Lynton his duties were to attend the medical needs of all officers of the civil establishment, ticket-of-leave men and sick natives in the area. He became the depot's unofficial medical superintendent and was referred to locally as Dr Horrocks. He also, against regulations, treated and dispensed to the settlers of the area, which eventually saw him reprimanded and in 1854 he resigned.

Horrocks received a conditional pardon on 19 April 1856, and set up as a storekeeper and postmaster at Wanerenooka (Northampton), while continuing to provide for the community's medical needs, free of charge. Although he was married, his wife does not appear to have joined him in Western Australia.

Between 1862 and 1856, he employed sixty ticket-of-leave men on the mine. He had a road surveyed, along which he built stone cottages which he leased to the married miners at low rent. He encouraged agriculture, experimenting with various crops. In 1861 he began construction of the colony's first interdenominational church, which was opened in October 1864. In November 1863 he applied to the Government for an acre of land for a schoolhouse and garden. The school was completed in 1866. Horrocks died on 7 October 1865 at Wanerenooka. The town of "Gwalla" became Northampton.

References

Further reading
 
  Gibbs, Martin.  1997 Landscapes of Meaning - Joseph Lucas Horrocks and the Gwalla Estate, Northampton, Western Australia. Historical Traces: Studies in Western Australian History,No. 17: 35-60, University of Western Australia Press, Nedlands.

1803 births
1866 deaths
Convicts transported to Western Australia
People from Northampton, Western Australia